DSN-2, also known as Kirameki-2, is a geostationary communications satellite to be operated by DSN Corporation, a subsidiary of SKY Perfect JSAT Group. Its payload is a pure X-band and will be used for military communications by the Japanese military. It was launched and successfully deployed on 24 January 2017 using a H-IIA rocket flying in its heaviest configuration, the H-IIA 204. It is Japan's first dedicated military communication satellite and is designed for at least fifteen years of service.

History 
JSAT along NEC, NTT Communications and Maeda Corporation formed a joint venture called DSN Corporation. On 15 January 2013, DSN Corporation announced that it had closed a contract with the Ministry of Defense to execute the "Program to Upgrade and Operate X-Band Satellite Communications Functions, etc". The contract is a private finance initiative, where private funds, management and technical capabilities are used to upgrade and operate the Japanese military X-band satellite network.

Based on this program, DSN Corporation will manufacture and launch two satellites plus perform the necessary upgrades to ground control stations. It will also operate, manage and maintain the facilities and equipment through fiscal years 2015 to 2030. The total program cost was estimated at ¥122,074,026,613.

The plan called for the launch of the first satellite, DSN-1, in December 2015, with a start of operations in March 2016 and a termination of operations in April 2030. The second satellite, DSN-2, was expected to launch in January 2017, starting operations in March 2017. The program and the operations of the second satellite were expected by March 2031.

JSAT role is the procurement and general management of the satellites. The first satellite, DSN-1, is actually an additional payload on one of JSAT's own satellites, Superbird-8. The second satellite, DSN-2 is a dedicated spacecraft to be built by Mitsubishi Electric.

In July 2016, it was published that a 25 May 2016 mishap during air transport of DSN-1 had delayed the satellite launch by an estimated two years. A dislodged tarpaulin had blocked the bleed valve on the satellite container and the spacecraft had suffer from over pressurization damage.

See also 

 GSAT-7
 2017 in spaceflight

References 

Communications satellites in geostationary orbit
Satellites using the DS2000 bus
Communications satellites of Japan
Satellites of Japan
Spacecraft launched in 2017
2017 in Japan
Spacecraft launched by H-II rockets